The 1945 Arkansas State Indians football team represented Arkansas State College—now known as Arkansas State University—as a member of the Arkansas Intercollegiate Conference (AIC) during the 1945 college football season. Led by first-year head coach Ike Tomlinson, the Indians compiled am overall record of 2–4–1 with a mark of 2–1 in conference play.

Schedule

References

Arkansas State
Arkansas State Red Wolves football seasons
Arkansas State Indians football